This is the discography of Jin (also known as Jin the Emcee, 100 Grand Jin and MC Jin), a Chinese-American rapper who makes English and Cantonese songs.

Albums

Studio albums

Collaborative albums

Extended plays

Jin released an EP named "Sincerely Yours 2.0" which was basically the same a Sincerely Yours but it was re-recorded and remastered.

Mixtapes

1996 Demo
Mixed/Hosted/Presented by:
Released: 1996(?)
Label:
Holla-Front
Mixed/Hosted/Presented by:
Released:
Label:
The Best of MC Battles Vol. 1
Mixed/Hosted/Presented by:
Released:
Label:
Swallow It Vol. 1
Mixed/Hosted/Presented by:
Released: 2002
Label:
Best of Jin
Mixed/Hosted/Presented by:
Released:
Label: 2002
The Next Generation
Mixed/Hosted/Presented by:
Released:
Label:
Straight Jin No Chaser
Mixed/Hosted/Presented by:
Released:
Label:
Friends and Family: Almost Famous
Mixed/Hosted/Presented by:
Released: 2003
Label:
The Yellow Tape
Mixed/Hosted/Presented by: DJ Kool Kid
Released: 2004
Label: Ruff Ryders
History In The Making
Mixed/Hosted/Presented by: DJ LRM
Released: 200?
Label: Ruff Ryders
The Definition Of History
Mixed/Hosted/Presented by: DJ LRM
Released: 200?
Label: Ruff Ryders
Lost History
Mixed/Hosted/Presented by: DJ LRM
Released: 200?
Label: Ruff Ryders
Asia Tour Mixtape
Mixed/Hosted/Presented by: Jin
Released: 2005
Label: Catch Music Group/Virgin Records/Ruff Ryders
G.a.R.T.E.E.'s World
Mixed/Hosted/Presented by:
Released: 2005
Label:
I Quit (The Last Mixtape)
Mixed/Hosted/Presented by: DJ Exclusive
Released:
Label:
Super-Lyrical: World Champion
Mixed/Hosted/Presented by: Sammy Needlz
Released: 2005
Label:
Mass Appeal
Mixed/Hosted/Presented by: DJ Heat
Released: 2006
Label:
Mass Appeal: Vol. 2
Mixed/Hosted/Presented by: DJ Heat
Released: 200?
Label:
A Couple Songs And Some Freestyles
Mixed/Hosted/Presented by:
Released: 200?
Label:
免費Rap
Mixed/Hosted/Presented by:
Released: January 25, 2009
Label: Universal Music Hong Kong/Hennessy Artistry
VLT Christmas Mixtape (aka:VLT Merry X'mas)
Mixed/Hosted/Presented by:
Released: 2009
Label:
2010 Hip Hop Census
Mixed/Hosted/Presented by:
Released: 2010
Label:
Say Something
Mixed/Hosted/Presented by:
Released:May 15, 2010
Label: Catch Music Group
Crazy Love Ridiculous Faith
Mixed/Hosted/Presented by:
Released: 28 August 2012
Label: Catch Adventures

Singles

Music videos

References

Discographies of American artists